Lake Neatahwanta is located in and near the city of Fulton in Oswego County, New York. Neatahwanta translates to "little lake near the big lake" in Iroquois.

It is currently prohibited to swim in the lake or to allow pets to have contact with the water due to pollution and microbial growth. It is currently being dredged in hope to have it open for public use again. It is expected to be fully clean in about 2 years.

Fishing
Fish species present in the lake are black crappie, pumpkinseed sunfish, bowfin, largemouth bass, northern pike, tiger muskie, white perch, black bullhead, bluegill, striped bass, and yellow perch. There is city owned access for a fee, with a hard surface boat takeoff and ramp located on the northwest shore off Phillips Street in the bordering campground.

References

External links 
Findlakes.com
Trails.com
Scorecard.org

Neatahwanta
Neatahwanta
Tourist attractions in Oswego County, New York